This is a list of members of the sixth Gauteng Provincial Legislature, as elected in the election of 8 May 2019 and taking into account changes in membership since the election.

Current composition

|-style="background:#e9e9e9;"
!colspan="2" style="text-align:left"| Party !! style="text-align:center"| Seats 
|-
|  || 37 
|-
|  || 20 
|-
|  || 11 
|-
|  || 3 
|-
|  || 1
|-
|  || 1 
|-
|colspan="2" style="text-align:left"| Total || style="text-align:right"| 73 
|}

Graphical representation
This is a graphical comparison of party strengths as they are in the 6th Gauteng Provincial Legislature.

Note this is not the official seating plan of the Gauteng Provincial Legislature.

Members

In the ANC caucus, former members included Thuliswa Nkabinde-Khawe (died November 2019), Kgosientso Ramokgopa (resigned November 2019), Mapiti Matsena (died July 2020), Dumisani Dakile (sworn in June 2019, resigned November 2020), Lindiwe Lasindwa (died August 2021), former Premier David Makhura (resigned October 2022), and Petrus Mabunda (resigned February 2023). Parks Tau was elected to a seat in May 2019 but left to join the national government shortly after the beginning of the legislative term; he returned to the provincial legislature in November 2020, but resigned again in February 2023. In addition to Dakile and Tau, other midterm additions to the legislature included Thulani Ndlovu (from November 2019, replacing Nkabinde-Khawe); Greg Schneemann (from August 2020); Maphefo Mogale-Letsie (September 2021); and Tshilidzi Munyai and Matshidiso Mfikoe, who replaced Mabunda and Tau (February 2023).

In the DA caucus, former members included John Moodey (resigned September 2020) and Michael Shackleton (resigned April 2022), both of whom defected to ActionSA.

References

Legislature